José Duarte (19 October 1935 – 23 July 2004), commonly known as Zé Duarte, was a Brazilian football manager.

Career
Duarte was the head coach of the Brazil women's national team at the 1996 Summer Olympics and 2000 Summer Olympics.

References

External links
 

1935 births
2004 deaths
Sportspeople from Campinas
Brazilian football managers
Guarani FC managers
Associação Atlética Ponte Preta managers
Santos FC managers
Cruzeiro Esporte Clube managers
Fluminense FC managers
Sport Club Internacional managers
Esporte Clube Bahia managers
Esporte Clube XV de Novembro (Jaú) managers
Botafogo Futebol Clube (SP) managers
Esporte Clube Noroeste managers
União São João Esporte Clube managers
Club Athletico Paranaense managers
Grêmio Esportivo Sãocarlense managers
Women's association football managers
Brazil women's national football team managers